Jan van Os (23 February 1744 – 7 February 1808) was a Dutch painter and a member of the renowned Van Os family of artists.

Biography
Van Os was born in Middelharnis. He was taught by Aert Schouman in The Hague, where he would spend the rest of his life. In 1773, he recorded in the painters' confraternity. In 1775, he married Susanna de La Croix, an able pastellist and the daughter of the deaf-mute portraitist Pieter Frederik de la Croix.

Van Os is mostly known for his fruit and flower still life paintings, though he started his career painting seascapes. His floral still lifes were painted in the style of Jan van Huysum, with the flowers usually presented on a marble ledge against a green background.

He was the father of artists Pieter van Os, Maria Margaretha van Os, and Georgius Jacobus Johannes van Os and grandfather to the painter Pieter Frederik van Os.

Jan van Os was the teacher of his children as well as Petronella van Woensel, a friend of his daughter Maria.

References 

The National Gallery
Artfact.com

1744 births
1808 deaths
18th-century Dutch painters
18th-century Dutch male artists
Dutch male painters
People from Middelharnis
Flower artists